Philipp Schloter is an international executive who is president and CEO of Abukai, a supplier of business productivity software, named one of the top 20 cloud services by PC Magazine and named "Instagram for Expense Reports" by Wireless Week.

Before Abukai, Schloter held the position of general manager at Nokia, leading a growth business unit based on the acquired business. Awards included a Wall Street Journal Innovation Award, a Stevie Award for "Marketing Campaign of the Year," and a Digital Emmy Nomination. Schloter was founder and chief executive officer of PIXTO, a visual search company, which Nokia acquired.

Schloter attended Stanford University, where he earned a BA in economics, BS in computer science and MS in electrical engineering. Schloter has been awarded over 20 patents.

References

American technology chief executives
American technology company founders
Stanford University alumni
Year of birth missing (living people)
Living people
Stanford University School of Engineering alumni